Prince Wilhelm of Urach, Count of Württemberg, 2nd Duke of Urach (Wilhelm Karl Florestan Gero Crescentius; German: Fürst Wilhelm von Urach, Graf von Württemberg, 2. Herzog von Urach; 30 May 1864 – 24 March 1928), was a German prince who was elected in June 1918 as King of Lithuania, with the regnal name of Mindaugas II. He never assumed the crown, however, as German authorities declared the election invalid; the invitation was withdrawn in November 1918. From 17 July 1869 until his death, he was the head of the morganatic Urach branch of the House of Württemberg.

Early life
Born as Wilhelm Karl Florestan Gero Crescentius, Count of Württemberg, he was the elder son of Wilhelm, 1st Duke of Urach (the head of a morganatic branch of the Royal House of the Kingdom of Württemberg), and his second wife, Princess Florestine of Monaco, occasional Regent of Monaco and daughter of Florestan I, Prince of Monaco.

At the age of four, Wilhelm succeeded his father as Duke of Urach. He was born and spent much of his childhood in Monaco, where his mother Florestine often managed the government during the extended oceanographic expeditions of her nephew, Prince Albert I. Wilhelm was culturally francophone.

Candidate for various thrones
Through his mother, Wilhelm was a legitimate heir to the throne of Monaco. Wilhelm's cousin Prince Albert I of Monaco had only one child, Prince Louis, who was unmarried and had no legitimate children.  The French Republic, however, was reluctant to see a German prince ruling Monaco.  Under French pressure, Monaco passed a law in 1911 recognising Louis's illegitimate daughter, Charlotte, as heir; she was adopted in 1918 by her grandfather Prince Albert I as part of the Monaco Succession Crisis of 1918. Wilhelm was relegated to third in line to Monaco's throne, behind Louis and Charlotte.  Furthermore, in July 1918 France and Monaco signed the Franco-Monegasque Treaty; it required all future princes of Monaco to be French or Monegasque citizens and secure the approval of the French government to succeed to the throne. After the accession of Prince Louis II in 1922, Wilhelm renounced his rights of succession to the throne of Monaco in favour of distant French cousins, the counts de Chabrillan, in 1924.

In 1913, Wilhelm was one of several princes considered for the throne of Albania. He was supported by Catholic groups in the north and attended the Albanian Congress of Trieste. In 1914 Prince William of Wied was selected instead.

In 1917, as a newly retired general, Wilhelm sounded out the possibility of being made Grand Duke of Alsace-Lorraine after the war was over. In 1918, he accepted the short-lived invitation to reign as Mindaugas II of Lithuania. His claims were published in a 2001 essay by his grandson-in-law, Sergei von Cube.

Military career
Typical of his family, Wilhelm entered the army in 1883 and was a professional general by the outbreak of World War I in 1914 as commander of the 26th Infantry Division (1st Royal Württemberg) of the Imperial German Army. Until November 1914 this division was part of the German assault on France, and then Belgium, where Wilhelm's sister-in-law Elisabeth of Belgium was queen. In December 1914, the division fought in the battle to cross the Bzura river in Poland. From June to September 1915, the division moved from north of Warsaw to positions close to the Neman River, an advance of hundreds of miles in the campaign in which Poland was taken (the Great Russian Retreat of World War I). In October–November 1915, the division took part in the Serbian Campaign, moving from west of Belgrade to Kraljevo in less than a month. The division served at Ypres in Belgium from December 1915 to July 1916, then was largely destroyed at the Somme battles from August to November 1916 while holding the Schwaben Redoubt (Swabia is part of Württemberg). Wilhelm retired as divisional general on 5 January 1917.

In 1917–18, Wilhelm was General Officer Commanding of the 64th Corps (Generalkommando 64) on the western front; his aides de camp included Eugen Ott and Erwin Rommel.

King of Lithuania

On 4 June 1918, the Council of Lithuania voted to invite Wilhelm to become the king of a newly independent Lithuania. Wilhelm agreed and was elected on 11 July 1918, taking the name Mindaugas II. His election can be explained by several factors:
he was Roman Catholic (the dominant religion in Lithuania);
he was not a member of the House of Hohenzollern, the family to which belonged the German Emperor William II, who wanted Lithuania to be a monarchy in personal union with Prussia;
the Treaty of Brest-Litovsk of March 1918 had established Germany's power in the region, for the time being;
he had had a successful military career;
if the Central Powers were to win the war, Lithuania could have expected German protection in the event of future intrusions by Russia.
According to Wilhelm's agreement with the Council of Lithuania, he had to live in Lithuania and learn to speak its language.

In addition, he was also descended from Casimir IV Jagiellon, grand duke of Lithuania, through his daughter Barbara Jagiellon.

From the beginning, Wilhelm's reign was controversial.  The four socialists of the twenty members of the Council of Lithuania left in protest. The German government did not recognize Wilhelm's selection as king, although the influential publicist and politician Matthias Erzberger, also a Catholic from Württemberg, supported the claim.  Wilhelm never had the chance to visit Lithuania; he remained instead at Lichtenstein Castle, his home south of Stuttgart. He did start to learn the Lithuanian language, however. Within a few months of his election, it became clear that Germany would lose World War I, and on 2 November 1918, the Council of Lithuania reversed its decision.

In the tiny chapel of Lichtenstein Castle is a framed letter from Pope Benedict XV welcoming Wilhelm's selection as the future king of Lithuania.

In 2009 Wilhelm's grandson Inigo was interviewed on television in Vilnius, and said: "...if he was honoured with a proposal to assume the throne of Lithuania, he would not refuse it."

The German anti-war novelist Arnold Zweig set his 1937 novel Einsetzung eines Königs (The Crowning of a King) around the election of Mindaugas in 1918.

Marriages and children

Wilhelm was married twice. On 4 July 1892, he married firstly Duchess Amalie in Bavaria (1865–1912), daughter of Karl-Theodor, Duke in Bavaria, a niece of Empress Elisabeth of Austria, and a direct descendant of the Lithuanian princess Ludwika Karolina Radziwiłł of Biržai. Nine children were born of this marriage:

 Princess Marie Gabriele (1893–1908)
 Princess Elizabeth (1894–1962) who married Prince Karl of Liechtenstein (1878–1955), an uncle of Franz Joseph II, Prince of Liechtenstein, and had issue.
 Princess Karola (1896–1980)
 Prince Wilhelm (1897–1957), who morganatically married Elisabeth Theurer (1899–1988) and had two daughters, Elisabeth and Marie Christine, neither of whom married.
 Karl Gero, Duke of Urach (1899–1981), 3rd Duke of Urach, who married Countess Gabriele of Waldburg-Zeil (1910–2005); no issue.
 Princess Margarete (1901–1975)
 Prince Albrecht (1903–1969), a diplomat; former artist turned journalist, and expert on the Far East. Married first Rosemary Blackadder and second Ute Waldschmidt, divorced both of them and had issue by both. His daughter Marie-Gabrielle (aka Mariga) was the first wife of Desmond Guinness. Albrecht's marriages were also considered morganatic, but his descendants use as surname Furst von Urach.
 Prince Eberhard (1907–1969), who married Princess Iniga of Thurn and Taxis (1925–2008) and had issue: Karl Anselm, Duke of Urach, born 1955, Wilhelm Albert, Duke of Urach, born 1957 and Prince Inigo of Urach, born 1962. 
 Princess Mechtilde (1912–2001), who married Friedrich Karl, Prince of Hohenlohe-Waldenburg-Schillingsfürst and had issue.

In 1924, Wilhelm married secondly Princess Wiltrud of Bavaria (1884–1975), daughter of King Ludwig III of Bavaria. This marriage was childless.

Prince Eberhard's son Inigo made a sentimental journey to Lithuania in November 2009, which was covered by the local media.

Honours

Ancestors

See also
 List of Lithuanian rulers
 Mindaugas
 House of Mindaugas
 Prince Frederick Charles of Hesse
 Archduke Charles Stephen of Austria
 Monaco Succession Crisis of 1918
 Florestan I children
 Duke Adolf Friedrich of Mecklenburg
 Kingdom of Finland (1918)

References

External links
 Schloss Lichtenstein
 Urach–family archive in Stuttgart

|-

|-

1864 births
1928 deaths
German Army generals of World War I
People from the Kingdom of Württemberg
German Roman Catholics
Dukes of Urach
Monegasque people of German descent
Monegasque Roman Catholics
Lithuanian people of German descent
Princes of Urach
Generals of Cavalry of Württemberg
People educated at Eton College
Alumni of Trinity College, Cambridge
Grand Crosses of the Order of Saint Stephen of Hungary
Recipients of the Military Merit Order (Bavaria), 1st class
Grand Crosses of the Order of Saint-Charles
Grand Crosses of the Order of Military Merit (Bulgaria)
Grand Crosses of the Order of the Dannebrog
Lithuanian monarchy
Kings of Lithuania